David Spiller (28 August 1942 - 5 June 2018)  was a British artist whose work was influenced by Pop Art and often featured Disney cartoon characters.

References

External links 
http://www.artnet.com/artists/david-spiller/
http://www.portlandgallery.com/artists/40608/david-spiller
https://www.youtube.com/watch?v=st8wmuHnsJE

1942 births
2018 deaths
British pop artists
British painters
Deaths from dementia in the United Kingdom
Deaths from Lewy body dementia
People from Swanley